Havířov is a city in Karviná District in the Moravian-Silesian Region of the Czech Republic. It has about 69,000 inhabitants, making it the second-largest city in the region. Havířov lies in the historical region of Cieszyn Silesia.

Havířov was founded in 1955 and is the youngest Czech city.

Administrative parts
The city is made up of eight administrative parts:

Bludovice
Dolní Datyně
Dolní Suchá
Město
Podlesí
Prostřední Suchá
Šumbark
Životice

Etymology
In a competition to name the city in 1956, various names were suggested, such as Stalin, Gottwaldův Horníkov (after Klement Gottwald), Zápotockýgrad (after Antonín Zápotocký) and "Čestprácov" (derived from the Socialist-era greeting čest práci). Eventually it was decided that the city should be named Havířov (from havíř, i.e. "miner", with the possessive suffix -ov).

History
The first written mention of settlements in today's Havířov area is from 1305 (Horní Suchá and Dolní Suchá). Bludovice was first mentioned in 1335 and Šumbark in 1438.

Havířov was founded after the World War II as a coal mining town to restore hard coal mining in the region. Building of first housing estates for miners and their families began in 1947. Havířov was officially established in 1955 and in the same year received the statute of a town.

Havířov was built on top of several villages with significant Polish populations. The local people were given apartments in the newly built city, and most of their old houses were demolished to make room for new urban buildings. The majority of the population of Havířov emigrated from other parts of Czechoslovakia, many of them from Slovakia, as migrant workers, thus substantially altering the ethnic structure of the area.

Today, the original villages are administrative parts of the city and mostly lie on the outskirts of urban Havířov. In 1975–1990, Horní Suchá, now a separate municipality, was a part of Havířov.

Most of the buildings of the new city were built in the style of socialist realism.

Demographics

Sport

Football
The city's football club, MFK Havířov, competes in the Czech Fourth Division. In the past, the team appeared for several seasons in Czech 2. Liga. Football club MFK Havířov was founded in 1922 as ČSK Moravská Suchá. MFK Havířov has two pitches and one artificial pitch. They have nickname which is "indians" according to American bikers. Their matches are played on pitches in Prostřední Suchá.

Ice hockey
The ice hockey club AZ Havířov appears in the 1st Czech Republic Hockey League, the second-tier league of ice hockey in the country.

Rugby
RC Havířov competes in the highest division of rugby in the Czech Republic, the KB Extraliga.

Cycling
Havířov hosted the prologue and the third stage, both an individual time trial, of the 2012 and 2013 Gracia-Orlová.

Notable people

Jan Bystroń (1860–1902), Polish linguist
Józef Kiedroń (1879–1932), Polish mining engineer and politician
Martin Mainer (born 1959), artist and professor
Daniel Zítka (born 1975), footballer
Jan Laštůvka (born 1982), footballer
Dominik Graňák (born 1983), ice hockey player
Robert Mayer (born 1989), ice hockey player
Pavel Maslák (born 1991), sprinter
Kateřina Pauláthová (born 1993), alpine skier
Kryštof (founded 1994), music band
David Pastrňák (born 1996), ice hockey player

Twin towns – sister cities

Havířov is twinned with:

 Collegno, Italy
 Harlow, England, United Kingdom
 Jastrzębie-Zdrój, Poland
 Mažeikiai, Lithuania
 Omiš, Croatia
 Paide, Estonia
 Turčianske Teplice, Slovakia
 Zagorje ob Savi, Slovenia

References

External links

 
Cities and towns in the Czech Republic
Cities in Silesia
Populated places in Karviná District
Socialist planned cities
Populated places established in 1955
1955 establishments in Czechoslovakia